D'Andrae Carnell Thurman (born October 25, 1980) is an American football wide receiver who is currently a free agent. He was signed by the New York Giants of the National Football League (NFL) as an undrafted free agent in 2004. He played college football at Southern Oregon University.

Thurman has also been a member of the Houston Texans, Green Bay Packers, Tennessee Titans, Winnipeg Blue Bombers and Dallas Desperados.

College career
Thurman played college football for the Arizona Wildcats and Southern Oregon University Raiders. During his time, he had 105 receptions, 1,530 receiving yards and 4 receiving touchdowns along with a kickoff return touchdown.

Professional career

New York Giants
On May 7, 2004, he was signed by the New York Giants of the National Football League as an undrafted free agent. On June 26, 2004, he was released.

Houston Texans
On July 2, 2004, he signed with the Houston Texans. On August 30, 2004, he was eventually released.

Pittsburgh Steelers
On September 7, 2004 he signed with the Pittsburgh Steelers to join their practice squad.

Green Bay Packers
On September 8, 2004 he signed with the Green Bay Packers. He only played 2 games and recorded 2 receptions for 12 yards.

Tennessee Titans
On September 4, 2005, he signed with the Tennessee Titans and was on the practice squad. He only appeared in 5 games and he return 9 punts for 31 yards along with 2 kickoff returns for 42 yards. On October 25, 2005, he was released after violating team rules.

Green Bay Packers
On October 25, 2005, he signed with the Green Bay Packers. He appeared in 10 games and started just one game. He recorded 7 receptions for 92 yards.

Winnipeg Blue Bombers
On May 18, 2006, he signed with the Winnipeg Blue Bombers of the Canadian Football League. He recorded 40 receptions for 426 yards and one touchdown.

Dallas Desperados
In 2007, he signed with the Dallas Desperados of the Arena Football League. He played for 2 seasons where recorded 65 receptions for 839 yards and 19 touchdowns.

Las Vegas Locomotives
In 2009, he signed with the Las Vegas Locomotives of the United Football League. In three seasons, he recorded 57 receptions for 796 yards and one touchdown. He is currently the UFL's All-Time leading in Receptions and receiving yards.

Arizona Rattlers
He signed with the Arizona Rattlers of the Arena Football League.

Milwaukee Mustangs
He signed with Milwaukee Mustangs of the Arena Football League.

Philadelphia Soul
He would next sign with the Philadelphia Soul and played in ArenaBowl XXVI.

Portland Thunder
On February 19, 2014, Thurman was traded to the Portland Thunder for future considerations, but was later released by the team.

Jacksonville Sharks
On April 16, 2014, Thurman was assigned to the Jacksonville Sharks. He was placed on reassignment on April 24, 2014.

Cleveland Gladiators
On October 9, 2014, Thurman was assigned to the Cleveland Gladiators. On June 23, 2015, Thurman was placed on reassignment.

References

External links
 Las Vegas Locomotives bio
 Milwaukee Mustangs bio

1980 births
Living people
American football wide receivers
American players of Canadian football
Arizona Rattlers players
Arizona Wildcats football players
Canadian football wide receivers
Dallas Desperados players
Green Bay Packers players
Houston Texans players
Las Vegas Locomotives players
Milwaukee Mustangs (2009–2012) players
Philadelphia Soul players
New York Giants players
Players of American football from Houston
Players of Canadian football from Houston
Southern Oregon Raiders football players
Tennessee Titans players
Winnipeg Blue Bombers players
Portland Thunder players
Jacksonville Sharks players
Cleveland Gladiators players